3034 Climenhaga  is a stony Florian asteroid and synchronous binary asteroid from the inner regions of the asteroid belt, approximately 7.8 kilometers in diameter. The asteroid was discovered on 24 September 1917 by German astronomer Max Wolf at Heidelberg Observatory in southwest Germany and assigned provisional designation . It was later named after Canadian astrophysicist John Climenhaga. Its minor-planet moon has a period of nearly 19 hours.

Orbital characteristics 

Climenhaga is a member of the Flora family, one of the largest families of stony asteroids in the main belt. It orbits the Sun in the inner main-belt at a distance of 1.8–2.8 AU once every 3 years and 6 months (1,294 days). Its orbit has an eccentricity of 0.21 and an inclination of 5° with respect to the ecliptic.

The asteroid's observation arc begins with its official discovery observation at Heidelberg, as no precoveries were taken, and no prior identifications were made.

Physical characteristics 

Climenhaga has been characterized as a common S-type asteroid.

Lightcurve 

In July 2009, a rotational lightcurve of Climenhaga was obtained from photometric observations by an international collaboration led by Australian astronomer Julian Oey at Kingsgrove 	and Leura  observatories. Lightcurve analysis gave a well-defined rotation period of 2.737485 hours with a brightness amplitude of 0.10 magnitude.

Diameter and albedo 

The Collaborative Asteroid Lightcurve Link assumes an albedo of 0.24 – derived from 8 Flora, a S-type asteroid and the family's largest member and namesake – and calculates a diameter of 7.82 kilometers with an absolute magnitude of 12.7.

Satellite 

During the photometric observation in July 2009, a minor-planet moon, designated , was discovered orbiting Climenhaga with an orbital period of 18.954 hours. The discovery was not announced until 2013. The satellite's orbit has an estimated semi-major axis of 19 kilometers.

Naming 

This minor planet was named in 1987 for Canadian John Leroy Climenhaga of the University of Victoria, in honour of his work in astrophysics. The approved naming citation was published by the Minor Planet Center on 16 December 1986.

References

External links 
 Asteroids with Satellites, Robert Johnston, johnstonsarchive.net
 Asteroid Lightcurve Database (LCDB), query form (info )
 Dictionary of Minor Planet Names, Google books
 Asteroids and comets rotation curves, CdR – Observatoire de Genève, Raoul Behrend
 Discovery Circumstances: Numbered Minor Planets (1)-(5000) – Minor Planet Center
 
 

003034
Discoveries by Max Wolf
Named minor planets
003034
19170924